Semyonovskoye is a rural locality (a selo) in Gorkinskoye Rural Settlement, Kirzhachsky District, Vladimir Oblast, Russia. The population was 13 as of 2010. There are 2 streets.

Geography 
Semyonovskoye is located on the Sherna River, 16 km north of Kirzhach (the district's administrative centre) by road. Gorka is the nearest rural locality.

References 

Rural localities in Kirzhachsky District